Biju Ningombam (born 26 December) is an Indian actress who appears in Manipuri films. Some of her famous films include Nungshi Feijei, Phishakhol, Nurei, Thabaton 3 and Ei Actor Natte.

2020 Gee Thoibi, Madam Panthoi, Wari Loidri, Mou Operation, Sibu Einaro, Sendoidi Ahing Tumde and Samjirei are her upcoming films.

Career
Biju Ningombam first appeared on television as a child artist in a teleplay Ningol Kada which was telecast on DDK Imphal. She acted in a Manipuri music video Phajarabi Nanggi Maithong produced by one of her cousin brother. Her debut appearance on silver screen is Meerang Mahum where she played a supporting role. She started taking main roles in films like Chou-En-Lai's Ashileibakki Hero and Ajit Ningthouja's Konggol. Her notable films where she took leading roles include Phishakhol, Mandalay Mathel, Thamoina Thamoida, Ei Actor Natte and Numit Tha.

As of 2021, Ningombam was seen in Tarun Wang's Khudi and Ojitbabu Ningthoujam's Satlo Leirang Satlo.

Accolades

Off-screen work
Ningombam is the brand ambassador of Saina Institute of Medical Sciences, Imphal. She is also the face of the RaDiant Group.

Selected filmography

References

External links
 

Indian film actresses
Living people
Meitei people
People from Imphal
Actresses from Manipur
Actresses in Meitei cinema
21st-century Indian actresses
Year of birth missing (living people)